Sonja Rose Weidenfelder (born 7 March 1993) is a German-Canadian ice hockey player and member of the German national team, currently playing in the German Women's Ice Hockey League (DFEL) with ECDC Memmingen. Her college ice hockey career was played in the Ontario University Athletics (OUA) conference of U Sports with the Toronto Varsity Blues women's ice hockey program under head coach Vicky Sunohara.

She represented Germany at the IIHF Women's World Championships in 2021 and 2022.

References

External links 
 

1993 births
Living people
Canadian women's ice hockey forwards
German ice hockey right wingers
German women's ice hockey forwards
Ice hockey people from Ontario
Toronto Varsity Blues ice hockey players